The Zwieseler Glassqueen (often only known as Glassqueen) represents a symbolic figure for the glass tradition in the Bavarian Forest and Zwiesel, the city where the glass handwork industry is concentrated. She is elected every two years and is introduced to the public during the Border Festival.

Tasks 
The Glassqueen's job is to promote Zwiesel and its glasswork industry. Therefore, she does presentation days. She has to represent at many appearances; the furthest journey took the glassqueen in 2015 to the European Parliament in Brussels, and in Germany up to the north to Zwiesel's twin town Brake. During their regency the Glassqueen and the Glassprincess have the opportunity to join famous people like Horst Seehofer, Minister-President of Bavaria. He invited her to the annual New years reception.
The Glassqueen is assisted in her tasks by the Glassprinzess.

List of former Glassqueens 
 2015/17: Andrea Herzog (Glasprincess: Riccarda Kroner)
 2013/15: Julia Wagenbauer (Glasprincess: Verena Probst)
 2011/13: Anja Weiß (Glasprincess: Miriam Schneck)
 2009/11: Kathrin Czysch (Glasprincess: Elena Brem)
 2007/09: Kristina Harant
 2005/07: Ramona Wenzl
 2003/05: Simone Molz

References

External links

Culture of Altbayern
Glass